Corey Hall (born 7 August 2002) is a professional rugby league footballer who plays as a  or er for the Wakefield Trinity in the Super League.

Career

Leeds Rhinos
Hall made his Super League debut in round 14 of the 2020 Super League season for Leeds against the Catalans Dragons.

York City Knights (loan)
On 8 July 2021, it was reported that he had signed for York City Knights in the RFL Championship on loan.

Wakefield Trinity
On 20 November 2021, it was reported that he had signed for Wakefield Trinity in the Super League.

References

External links
Leeds Rhinos profile
SL profile

2002 births
Living people
English rugby league players
Leeds Rhinos players
Rugby league wingers
Rugby league centres
Rugby league fullbacks
York City Knights players
Wakefield Trinity players